O Tempo Não Para (English: Crashing Into the Future) is a Brazilian telenovela produced and broadcast by TV Globo. It premiered on 31 July 2018, replacing Deus Salve o Rei, and ended on 28 January 2019, being replaced by Verão 90. It was created by Mario Teixeira in collaboration with Bíbi Da Pieve, Tarcísio Lara Puiati, Marcos Lazarini, Marcelo Travesso, and Adriano Melo. The artistic director is Leonardo Nogueira.

It stars Juliana Paiva, Nicolas Prattes, Cleo Pires, Edson Celulari, Rosi Campos, Christiane Torloni, Carol Castro, Eva Wilma, Regiane Alves, João Baldasserini, and Adriane Galisteu in the main roles.

Plot
The story begins in 1886 and features the Sabino Machado family, who live in São Paulo. The family owns several plots of land for gold and ore mining, as well as investments in telephony. The family embarks on the Europe-bound Albatross, one of the safest ships of the time. Dom Sabino (Edson Celulari) plans to visit the shipyard he bought in England, keeping his daughter Marocas (Juliana Paiva) away from the city's talk after she refused a wedding at the altar. The ship detours for a brief visit to Patagonia, but it collides with an iceberg.

The ship is shipwrecked, and most of the passengers freeze due to the low water temperature. There are thirteen people on board: the Sabino Machado family, comprising Dom Sabino, Dona Agustina (Rosi Campos), Marocas, and twins Nico (Raphaela Alvitos) and Kiki (Nathalia Rodrigues); slaves Damásia (Aline Dias), Cairu (Cris Vianna), Cesária (Olivia Araujo), Menelau (David Junior), and Cecílio (Maicon Rodrigues); bookkeeper Teófilo (Kiko Mascarenhas); preceptor Miss Celine (Maria Eduarda de Carvalho); young Bento (Bruno Montaleone); and Pirate the dog.

132 years later, a large block of ice approaches Guarujá beach in São Paulo. Samuca (Nicolas Prattes) is a businessman involved in social causes and the owner of the SamVita Holding and the Vita Foundation, which focuses on recycling. Samuca first sees the ice block while surfing. He is soon fascinated by the frozen face of Marocas. When a fissure threatens to break the ice block, Samuca – wanting to save Marocas – clings to the block and is drawn by the current to the bottom, arriving at the fictional Red Island. The other frozen humans are taken to Criotec, a laboratory specializing in cryogenics. The ice block's arrival generates curiosity and stirs a national commotion. Gradually, each of the frozen humans wake up, facing a new contemporary reality.

Cast
 Juliana Paiva as Maria Marcolina "Marocas" Sabino Machado
 Nicolas Prattes as Samuel "Samuca" Tercena de Faria
 Cleo Pires as Betina Carvalhal
 Edson Celulari as Teotônio Augusto Sabino Machado "Dom Sabino"
 Rosi Campos as Agostina Sabino Machado
 Christiane Torloni as Carmen Tercena
 Carol Castro as Comandante Waleska Tibério Souto "Wal"
 Eva Wilma as Petra Vaisánen
 João Baldasserini as Emílio Inglês de Souza and Lúcio Inglês de Souza
 Regiane Alves as Mariacarla Borelli
 Milton Gonçalves as Eliseu Emerenciano
 Marcos Pasquim as Marino Santiago
 Alexandra Richter as Monalisa Santiago
 Adriane Galisteu as Zelda Larocque / Zelda Mirtila Lourenço
 Luiz Fernando Guimarães as Dr. Amadeu Baroni
 Maria Eduarda de Carvalho as Celine Elizabeth Fielding "Miss Celine"
 Felipe Simas as Elmo Viégas
 Kiko Mascarenhas as Teófilo Magalhães Quaresma
 Rafaela Mandelli as Helen Azeredo
 Raphael Viana as Capitão Mateus Gonzaga
 Solange Couto as Albina Tibério Souto
 Raphaela Alvitos as Maria Nicolina "Nico" Sabino Machado
 Natthália Gonçalves as Maria Quitéria "Kiki" Sabino Machado
 Olívia Araújo as Cesária
 Cris Vianna as Cairu
 Lucy Ramos as Vanda Lorde
 Carol Macedo as Paulina Emerenciano da Silva
 Bruno Montaleone as Francisco Bento de Castro Domingue
 Aline Dias as Damásia
 Micael Borges as Laércio "Lalá" Batista Emerenciano
 Talita Younan as Vera Lúcia Ribeiro
 Wagner Santisteban as Pedro Parede
 David Junior as Menelau Sabino Machado
 Maicon Rodrigues as Cecílio Sabino Machado
 Juliana Alves as Maria José Viana "Mazé"
 Rui Ricardo Diaz as Adam Emerenciano da Silva "Barão"
 Malu Falangola as Natália "Nat" Figueiroa
 Ricardo Duque as Florêncio
 Bia Montez as Januza Palhares
 Cyria Coentro as Marciana
 Max Lima as Omar
 Fhelipe Gomes as Lucas
 João Fernandes as Gabiru
 Cláudio Mendes as Herberto Douglas
 Beatriz Campos as Agnese

Soundtrack 

O Tempo Não Para (Trilha Sonora da Novela) is the soundtrack of the telenovela, released on 24 August 2018 by Som Livre.

Ratings 

According to IBOPE's consolidated data, the premiere recorded a viewership rating of 31.9 points and a 46% share in São Paulo, the highest viewership indices in the time slot since 2012. In Rio de Janeiro, it recorded 34 points and a 49% share, the highest rating since 2010.

References

External links
  
 

TV Globo telenovelas
Brazilian telenovelas
2018 Brazilian television series debuts
2019 Brazilian television series endings
Comedy telenovelas
2018 telenovelas
Brazilian LGBT-related television shows
Gay-related television shows
Portuguese-language telenovelas
Cryonics in fiction